Mesrabad (also Romanized as Meşrābād; also known as Misrābād) is a village in Shivanat Rural District, Afshar District, Khodabandeh County, Zanjan Province, Iran. At the 2006 census, its population was 499, in 100 families.

References 

Populated places in Khodabandeh County